The supraorbital gland is a type of lateral nasal gland found in some species of marine birds, particularly penguins, which removes sodium chloride from the bloodstream. The gland's function is similar to that of the kidneys, though it is much more efficient at removing salt, allowing penguins to survive without access to fresh water. Contrary to popular belief, the gland does not directly convert saltwater to freshwater. The term supraorbital refers to the area just above the eye socket (which is known as the orbit).

Living in saltwater environments would naturally pose a large problem for penguins because the ingestion of  saltwater would be detrimental to a penguin's health.  Although penguins do not directly drink water, it is taken in when they engulf prey.  As a result, saltwater enters their system and must be effectively excreted.  The supraorbital gland has thus enabled the penguins' survival in such environments due to its water-filtering capability.  The gland is located just above the eyes and surrounds a capillary bed in the head. This capillary bed constantly strains out the salt in the saltwater that a penguin takes in. Since the byproduct of the gland has roughly five times as much salt as would normally be found in the animal's fluids, the supraorbital gland is highly efficient.

The penguin excretes the salt byproduct as a brine through its bill.  Often, the fluid drips out, and this gives the appearance of a runny nose. However, the fluid may also be sneezed out. In the absence of saltwater, caused by captivity, the supraorbital gland will lie dormant as it has no other purpose.  Having a dormant supraorbital gland does not negatively affect the health of a penguin.

See also
Osmoregulation
Preorbital gland
Salt gland

References

External links 

Glands
Bird anatomy